Man on Fire is a 2018 documentary film by Joel Fendelman about the 2014 self-immolation of anti-racist social justice pastor Charles Moore in his hometown of Grand Saline, Texas.

It won the David L. Wolper Award of the International Documentary Association, the Best Student Award at the San Luis Obispo Film Festival, and the Feature Film Programmers Choice Award at the Sidewalk Film Festival. It was nominated for Best Documentary Feature at the Slamdance Film Festival.

References

External links
 
 Man on Fire on PBS

American documentary films
2010s American films